Max Kronert (born Max Josef Florian Trübsand; c. 1873 – 22 July 1925) was a German stage and film actor.

Selected filmography
 Carmen (1918)
 The Monastery of Sendomir (1919)
 The Toy of the Tsarina (1919)
 The Oyster Princess (1919)
 Countess Doddy (1919)
 My Wife, the Movie Star (1919)
 Die Tochter des Mehemed (1919)
 The Doll (1919)
 The Lady in Black (1920)
 The Golem: How He Came into the World (1920)
 Sumurun (1920)
 Panic in the House of Ardon (1920)
 Satan (1920)
 The Riddle of the Sphinx (1921)
 The Wild Cat (1921)
 The Adventuress of Monte Carlo (1921)
 The Eternal Curse (1921)
 The Rats (1921)
 Playing with Fire (1921)
 Das Rätsel der Sphinx (1921)
 The White Desert (1922)
 Louise de Lavallière (1922)
 Alles für Geld (1923)
 I.N.R.I. (1923)
 A Woman for 24 Hours (1925)

References

Bibliography
 Eisner, Lotte H. The Haunted Screen: Expressionism in the German Cinema and the Influence of Max Reinhardt. University of California Press, 2008.
 Hardt, Ursula. From Caligari to California: Erich Pommer's Life in the International Film Wars. Berghahn Books, 1996.

External links

1870s births
1925 deaths
German male stage actors
German male film actors
German male silent film actors
20th-century German male actors
Actors from Wrocław